ESPN4 is a Brazilian sports channel that was launched on 5 February 2012 as Fox Sports, replacing the Brazilian variant of Speed. A second channel, Fox Sports 2 was launched on 24 January 2014, which continues to use the Fox Sports name temporarily due to contractual obligations. On May 6, 2020 Brazil's antitrust regulator CADE announced that Fox Sports and ESPN Brasil could merge as part of the 21st Century Fox merger with Disney, with it remaining as-is until January 1, 2022 due to its broadcast rights and overall structure.

Fox Sports main channel was rebranded as ESPN4 in Brazil on 17 January 2022, becoming the fourth network among those of the domestic version of ESPN. Fox Sports 2 will remain on-air in Brazil under that name until at least 29 October 2022, due to contractual language with CONMEBOL regarding its coverage of the 2022 Copa Libertadores.

Programming rights

Football 
 UEFA Europa League 
 UEFA Europa Conference League 
 Premier League 
 EFL Championship 
 EFL Cup 
 La Liga 
 DFB-Pokal
 Serie A
 Ligue 1
 Coupe de France
 Primeira Liga
 Eredivisie
 AFC Champions League
 CONMEBOL Libertadores
 Argentine Primera División
 Copa do Nordeste
 CONCACAF Champions League
 Major League Soccer
 Copa América
 UEFA Women's Euro

American Football 
 National Football League

Baseball 
 Major League Baseball

Boxing 
 ESPN Knockout

Motorsports 
 MotoGP
 Moto2
 Moto3
 MotoE
 Dakar Rally
 World Rally Championship
 FIA World Endurance Championship
 Extreme E
 TCR South America Touring Car Championship
 DTM
 IndyCar Series
 Indy Lights

Professional wrestling 
 WWE

Programs broadcast by ESPN4 in Brazil 
 Além da Bola
 Bola da Vez
 Especial Libertadores
 ESPN FC
 Inside Serie A
 La Liga World
 Momento ESPN
 Mundo Premier League
 Resenha
 Show da Rodada: Coppa Italia
 Show da Rodada: La Liga
 Show da Rodada: Ligue 1
 Show da Rodada: Serie A
 Show da Rodada: Premier League
 SportsCenter Abre o Jogo
 UEFA Europa League Highlights
 UEFA Europa & Conference League Magazine
 UEFA Nations League: Match Day Highlights
 UEFA Nations League: Match Night Highlights
 The Inside Line

Staff

Play-by-play 
 Antero Greco (Soccer)
 Camilla Garcia (soccer and Basketball)
 Cledi Oliveira (Soccer)
 Eliane Trevisan (Soccer and Tennis)
 Hamilton Rodrigues (Soccer, Tennis and MotoGP)
 Luciana Marianno (Soccer)
 Marco Alfaro (WWE)
 Matheus Pinheiro (Soccer and NFL)
 Matheus Suman (Basketball)
 Paulo Andrade (Soccer)
 Renan do Couto (Motorsports, Soccer and NFL)
 Rogério Vaughan (Soccer)
 Thiago Alves (Motorsports and MLB)

Color commentators 
 Carlos Eugênio Simon (Soccer)
 Christian Fittipaldi (IndyCar Series)
 Edgard Mello Filho (Motorsports)
 Eugênio Leal (Soccer)
 Fausto Macieira (MotoGP)
 Gian Oddi (Soccer)
 Gustavo Zupak (Soccer)
 Juliana Tesser (MotoGP)
 Livio Reis (WWE)
 Mauro Naves (Soccer)
 Mário Filho (MMA)
 Mário Marra (Soccer)
 Osvaldo Pascoal (Soccer)
 Paulo Godinho (Boxe)
 Rafael Marques (Soccer)
 Raphael Prates (Soccer)
 Renata Ruel (Soccer)
 Renato Rodrigues (Soccer)
 Roberto Figueroa (WWE)
 Rodrigo Bueno (Soccer)
 Thiago Alves (Motorsports)
 Victor Martins (Motorsports)
 Ubiratan Leal (Soccer, MLB and NFL)
 Zinho (Soccer)

References

External links
 

Sports television networks in Brazil
Television stations in Brazil
ESPN
2012 establishments in Brazil
Television channels and stations established in 2012
The Walt Disney Company Latin America